Ex parte Bollman, 8 U.S. (4 Cranch) 75 (1807), was a case brought before the United States Supreme Court. Bollman held that the constitutional definition of treason excluded mere conspiracy to levy war against the United States.

Erick Bollman and Samuel Swartwout were civilians who became implicated in the Burr-Wilkinson Plot. This plot supposedly consisted of Aaron Burr and James Wilkinson attempting to create an empire in the United States, ruled by Burr. In 1806, Wilkinson informed President Thomas Jefferson of the plot, ending whatever may have actually been planned. Bollman and Swartwout attempted to recruit others into the plot, but these individuals informed the military, which promptly arrested them.

The Supreme Court decided that "To constitute a levying of war, there must be an assemblage of persons for the purpose of effecting by force a treasonable purpose. Enlistments of men to serve against government is not sufficient."

See also
 Cramer v. United States: a later treason case before the high court.
List of United States Supreme Court cases, volume 8

References

External links
 

United States Constitution Article One case law
United States Constitution Article Three case law
United States Supreme Court cases
United States Supreme Court cases of the Marshall Court
Criminal cases in the Marshall Court
Suspension Clause case law
1807 in United States case law
Treason Clause case law
United States Constitution Article Three venue case law
United States habeas corpus case law
Original habeas cases